Subarna Golak is an Indian Bengali comedy drama film directed by Manu Sen based on the same name novel of Bankim Chandra Chatterjee. This film was released in 1981 in the banner of Kalimata Productions. Music and script writing were made by Hemanta Mukherjee and Birendra Krishna Bhadra respectively.

Plot
Lord Shiva threw away a golden ball that even the gods are scared to keep. The ball creates greed and violence amongst the gods due to its opulence. Shiva had endowed the ball with a magical power, whenever a person physically hands it over to someone else, they start behaving like each other. When it reaches Earth, accidentally a typical Bengali Babu is the first person to find it while going to his in-laws’ home. He gives it to his servant to carry, and when their minds get exchanged, comedy ensues.

Cast
 Prosenjit
 Debashree Roy
 Dipankar Dey
 Rabi Ghosh
 Utpal Dutt
 Mahua Roychoudhury
 Chinmoy Roy
 Sulata Chowdhury
 Kalikinkar Banerjee
 Rathin Basu
 Bishwanath Banerjee
 Swaraj Basu
 Shambhu Bhattacharya
 Dhiman Chakraborty

Music
"Katodin Ami Dekhini Tomar Mukh" - Arundhati Holme Chowdhury
"Ei Chand Mukh Dekhe" - Papia Bhattacharya
"Shukla Paksha Krishna Paksha" - Anup Ghoshal
"Ami Aaj Bhebechhi Mone" - Anup Ghoshal
"Din Nei Raat Nei" - Hemant Kumar, Chorus

External links

References

1981 films
Bengali-language Indian films
1980s fantasy comedy-drama films
Indian fantasy comedy-drama films
Films based on Indian novels
Films scored by Hemant Kumar
1980s Bengali-language films